The Daily Leader is a daily newspaper published in Pontiac, Illinois, United States. Former owner GateHouse Media purchased roughly 160 daily and weekly newspapers from Hollinger Inc. in 1997.

In addition to the daily product, GateHouse also publishes two weekly newspapers in The Daily Leader coverage area: the Home Times of Flanagan, and The Blade of Fairbury.

The daily paper also covers Chenoa, El Paso and Dwight.

References

External links 
 

Newspapers published in Illinois
Livingston County, Illinois
Pontiac, Illinois
Publications established in 1880
1880 establishments in Illinois
Gannett publications